The men's 50 metre rifle prone team competition at the 2002 Asian Games in Busan, South Korea was held on 5 October at the Changwon International Shooting Range.

Schedule
All times are Korea Standard Time (UTC+09:00)

Records

Results

References 

2002 Asian Games Report, Pages 604–605
Results

External links
Official website

Men Rifle 50 P T